Boogie People is the eighth studio album released by George Thorogood and the Destroyers.  It was released in 1991 on the EMI label.  The album peaked at #77 on the Billboard 200.

Track listing 
 "If You Don't Start Drinkin' (I'm Gonna Leave)" (George Thorogood) – 4:11  
 "Long Distance Lover" (Thorogood) – 3:57  
 "Mad Man Blues" (John Lee Hooker) – 3:26  
 "Boogie People" (Cyril B. Bunter, Thorogood) – 3:33  
 "I Can't Be Satisfied" (McKinley Morganfield) – 3:38  
 "No Place to Go" (Chester Arthur Burnett) – 4:42  
 "Six Days on the Road" (Earl Green, Carl Montgomery) – 4:27  
 "Born in Chicago" (Nick Gravenites) – 3:24  
 "Oklahoma Sweetheart" (Thorogood) – 4:30  
 "Hello Little Girl (George Thorogood)" (Chuck Berry) – 3:46

Personnel 
The following personnel are credited on the album:

Musicians

 George Thorogood – guitar, vocals
 Billy Blough – bass guitar
 Hank Carter – saxophone, vocals
 Jeff Simon – drums
 Steve Chrismar – guitar

Technical

 Delaware Destroyers – producer
 Terry Manning – producer, engineer, mixing
 Bob Ludwig – mastering
 Diane Cuddy – design
 Henry Marquez – art direction
 Alan Messer – photography (front cover)
 Jeffrey Scales – photography (back cover)
 John Tobler – liner notes

Charts

References 

George Thorogood and the Destroyers albums
1991 albums
Albums produced by Terry Manning
EMI Records albums